Korey Bryan Lee (born July 25, 1998) is an American professional baseball catcher for the Houston Astros of Major League Baseball (MLB). 

From Escondido, California, Lee attended University of California, Berkeley, where he played college baseball for the Golden Bears. He was selected by the Astros in the first round of the 2019 MLB draft, and made his MLB debut in 2022.

Amateur career
Lee attended Vista High School in Vista, California. As a senior in 2016, he hit .407 with 21 RBIs. He was not drafted in the 2016 Major League Baseball (MLB) draft out of high school, and he then enrolled at the University of California, Berkeley where he played college baseball for the California Golden Bears.

In 2017, Lee's freshman season at California, he appeared in 28 games (making 18 starts), batting .277 with three RBIs. After the season, he played in the Northwoods League. As a sophomore in 2018, he played in 36 games, making 28 starts, hitting .238 with five home runs and 26 RBIs. He returned to play in the Northwoods League that summer, hitting .283 with six home runs and 44 RBIs in 57 games. Lee broke out as a junior in 2019, slashing .339/.415/.613 with 15 home runs and 57 RBIs over fifty games, earning a spot on the Pac-12 First Team.

Professional career
The Houston Astros selected Lee with the 32nd overall pick of the 2019 MLB draft.  He signed for $1.75 million, and made his professional debut with the Tri-City ValleyCats of the Class A Short Season New York–Penn League, with whom he spent the whole season. Over 64 games, Lee slashed .268/.359/.371 with three home runs, 28 RBIs, and eight stolen bases.

Lee did not play a minor league game in 2020 due to the cancellation of the minor league season caused by the COVID-19 pandemic. To begin the 2021 season, he was assigned to the Asheville Tourists of the High-A East. After slashing .330/.397/.459 with three home runs and 14 RBIs over 29 games, he was promoted to the Corpus Christi Hooks of the Double-A Central on June 14. In mid-August, he was placed on the injured list with an oblique strain, and was activated in early September. Over fifty games with the Hooks, Lee hit .254/.320/.443 with eight home runs and 27 RBIs. After the end to Corpus Christi's season, Lee was promoted to the Sugar Land Skeeters of the Triple-A West, and played in nine games with them.  Lee ended the 2021 season with a combined .277/.340/.438 slash line with 11 home runs and 45 RBIs over 88 games between the three clubs. He was selected to play in the Arizona Fall League for the Glendale Desert Dogs after the season. He returned to Sugar Land to begin the 2022 season.

On July 1, 2022, the Astros selected Lee's contract and promoted him to the major leagues. He made his MLB debut that night as a pinch hitter for Martín Maldonado versus the Los Angeles Angels and was retired on a pop-up.  On July 4, 2022, Lee made his first major league start for the Astros against the Kansas City Royals at Minute Maid Park.  Lee led Houston's offense versus the Oakland Athletics on July 10, singling off starter Cole Irvin in the fifth inning to score Jake Meyers for his first major league hit and RBI. In the seventh inning, Lee collected his first major league double and recorded two more RBIs. He completed a 3-for-4 night with three RBIs as Houston won 6–1.

The Astros optioned Lee to Sugar Land on August 2, 2022. On August 23, he homered three times and drove in a career-high five to lead a 23–8 win over the Las Vegas Aviators.  It was also the first multi-homer game of his professional career. Before Game 6 of the 2022 World Series, the Astros replaced Yuli Gurriel, who exited Game 5 with a knee injury, on their roster with Lee.  The Astros defeated the Philadlphia Phillies in that game for their fourth win in the best-of-seven series to give Lee his first career World Series title.

See also

 List of University of California, Berkeley alumni

References

External links

California Golden Bears bio

1998 births
Living people
Sportspeople from Escondido, California
Baseball players from California
Major League Baseball catchers
Houston Astros players
California Golden Bears baseball players
Tri-City ValleyCats players
Asheville Tourists players
Corpus Christi Hooks players
Sugar Land Skeeters players
Glendale Desert Dogs players
Sugar Land Space Cowboys players
La Crosse Loggers players